Michael Francis Fallon (May 17, 1867 – February 22, 1931) was an Irish-Canadian Catholic priest and a Canadian football coach. He was the head coach of the Ottawa Gee-Gees teams in the 1890s.

Fallon was born to Irish immigrants to Canada. From April 25, 1910 until his death on February 22, 1931, he was Bishop of Roman Catholic Diocese of London, Ontario. He is buried in the chapel of London's St. Peter's Seminary.

References

Notes

1867 births
1931 deaths
Sportspeople from Kingston, Ontario
Canadian people of Irish descent
Canadian Roman Catholic bishops
Ottawa Gee-Gees football coaches